This article provides details of international football games played by the North Korea national football team from 2000 to 2009.

Results

2000

2001

2002

2003

2004

2005

2007

2008

2009

Notes

References

Football in North Korea
2000
2000s in North Korean sport